The metallic-winged sunbird (Aethopyga pulcherrima) is a species of bird in the family Nectariniidae. It is endemic to the Philippines.

Its natural habitats are subtropical or tropical moist lowland forests and subtropical or tropical moist montane forests.

References

metallic-winged sunbird
Endemic birds of the Philippines
metallic-winged sunbird
Taxonomy articles created by Polbot